La Serra is a small village (curazia) in the European republic of San Marino.

Location
This village is located in the northern part of the municipality of Acquaviva, and the only other village in Acquaviva is Gualdicciolo.

Namesake
La Serra is named after a family that fled the Italian town of Pesaro in 1234 because of debts incurred by the head of household, Arnoldo La Serra.

Accessibility
Due to the lack of road connections with the rest of the San Marino republic, this village is only reachable from Italy, via the municipality of Verucchio.

References

Curazie in San Marino
Acquaviva (San Marino)